Buddy the Woodsman is a 1934 Warner Bros. Looney Tunes cartoon, directed by Jack King. The short was released on October 27, 1934, and stars Buddy, the second star of the series.

Summary
A tree comes down in a forest and several lumberjacks hack away at it with their axes. To the side, two lumberjacks, one a muscular man, the other one rather scrawny, chop at a tree, but only the larger man makes any progress. The skinny fellow prances off to a tiny sapling and with some effort chops it down, only to end up with pieces of it stuck to his head. The pieces resemble antlers. The lumber men have several inventive methods for chopping trees: one, involving a tractor-like vehicle with a large saw protruding from its side, leads to the felling of a guard tower in the forest!

The scene switches to Buddy, who, upon chopping a tree with his axe, sends such a shake upwards that a mother and father bird are forced to remove their nest and babies from the tree top and carry the nest elsewhere. Some time obviously passes, for in the next scene, Buddy has already succeeded in felling the trunk. Merrily whistling away, Our Hero next gently glides a lawnmower-like device across a fallen trunk, in the process creating many toothpicks, which he then dumps into a truck, yelling to the driver: "Take it away!" Using a saw as though it were a jump rope, Buddy cuts a standing tree into several smaller pieces.

Buddy so goads a goat that the creature chases him. The goat's horns cut through the suspended logs atop which Buddy runs from the pursuing creature. Eventually, the goat rams headfirst into a tree, and gets incapacitated. Buddy then carries an armful of small logs, but drops them, upon tripping, just perfectly that they are arranged across a wooden stand as a xylophone, which Buddy then plays by means of two axes: a totem pole comes to life and dances for the lumberjacks. The hard-working men are called to supper: enthusiastically, they wash up. A song before the meal: "I Open the Old Northwest", with Buddy at the piano. Cookie serves the men their spaghetti.

As the men enjoy their food, a bear (with ears like those of Mickey Mouse) enters the dining cabin through its chimney; the men disappear (almost inexplicably, through the floorboards), leaving Cookie to scold the unwelcome beast. Having no success, Cookie hides and calls Buddy, who punches the bear in the nose, causing it to fall backwards into a stove and catch a stovepipe on its wounded snout. Now the bear is mad! Buddy throws hot pepper at the incensed creature, causing it to sneeze all of the dishes on the table back into place on a nearby shelf. A chase ensues. Reemerging, Cookie fires a shotgun at the bear's behind, causing the bear's focus to change. Buddy tosses the playing stool (which had been sitting at the piano) at the bear, and, in an inveterate gag, the stool's midsection extends underneath the bear that the invader is lifted out of the building (through the roof); the bear runs off as Buddy & Cookie, at the piano, sing "The Bear Went over the Mountain".

Dating discrepancy
The article Looney Tunes and Merrie Melodies filmography (1929-1939) & Leonard Maltin's Of Mice and Magic, hereinafter cited, both claim October 20 as this cartoon's release date; however, conflicts arise as to the order in which the cartoons featuring Buddy were released. For more on this issue see the relevant section of the article Buddy's Circus.

Cookie
Cookie, who usually here has blond, braided hair. This occurs only in those shorts directed by Jack King, though not all of them.

References

External links
 
 

1934 films
1934 animated films
1930s American animated films
1930s animated short films
American black-and-white films
Films scored by Bernard B. Brown
Films scored by Norman Spencer (composer)
Animated films about bears
Films directed by Jack King
Buddy (Looney Tunes) films
Looney Tunes shorts
Films set in forests